Aleh Shkabara (born 15 February 1983) is a Belarusian former footballer.

Honours
Naftan Novopolotsk
Belarusian Cup winner: 2011–12

International goals

References

External links
 
 

1983 births
Living people
Belarusian footballers
Association football midfielders
Belarusian expatriate footballers
Belarus international footballers
Expatriate footballers in Russia
Russian Premier League players
FC Traktor Minsk players
FC Dynamo Moscow players
FC BATE Borisov players
FC Gomel players
FC Ural Yekaterinburg players
FC Dinamo Minsk players
FC Naftan Novopolotsk players
FC Smolevichi players
FC Molodechno players
FC Sputnik Rechitsa players
Footballers from Minsk